Yored Hillel Konaté (born 28 December 1994) is a professional footballer who plays as a goalkeeper for the French club Valenciennes FC in the Ligue 2. Born in France, and a former youth international for the Ivory Coast, Konaté plays for the Burkina Faso national team.

Professional career
Konaté began playing football in the youth academy of Châteauroux, and moved to the academy Sochaux II in 2009.

On 12 June 2018, Konaté transferred from US Boulogne to Valenciennes FC in the Ligue 2. He made his professional debut with Valenciennes in a 1–0 Coupe de la Ligue loss to FC Lorient on 14 August 2018.

International career
Konaté was born in France and is of Ivorian and Burkinabé descent. He represented the Ivory Coast U17s at the 2011 FIFA U-17 World Cup, starting in all 4 of their matches in the tournament.

He was called up to the senior Ivory Coast national football team in 2015, but did not make an appearance. In 2022, he was called up to the Burkina Faso national team for a set of friendlies. He debuted with Burkina Faso in a 2–1 friendly win over Comoros on 27 September 2022.

References

External links

 
 LFP Profile

1994 births
Living people
Sportspeople from Poitiers
Association football goalkeepers
Burkinabé footballers
Burkina Faso international footballers
Ivorian footballers
Ivory Coast under-20 international footballers
French footballers
Citizens of Ivory Coast through descent
Burkinabé people of Ivorian descent
Ivorian people of Burkinabé descent
French sportspeople of Ivorian descent
French sportspeople of Burkinabé descent
Valenciennes FC players
US Boulogne players
Ligue 2 players
Championnat National players
Championnat National 2 players
Championnat National 3 players
Footballers from Nouvelle-Aquitaine